The First Minister and deputy First Minister of Northern Ireland are the joint heads of government of the Northern Ireland Executive and have overall responsibility for the running of the Executive Office. Despite the different titles for the two offices, the two positions have the same governmental power, resulting in a duumvirate; the deputy First Minister is not subordinate to the First Minister. Created under the terms of the 1998 Good Friday Agreement, both were initially nominated and appointed by members of the Northern Ireland Assembly on a joint ticket by a cross-community vote, using consociational principles. That process was changed following the 2006 St Andrews Agreement, meaning that the First Minister is nominated by the largest party overall, and the deputy First Minister is nominated by the largest party in the next largest community designation.

On 17 June 2021, despite a letter from the Democratic Unionist Party chairman and other senior party members, DUP leader Edwin Poots nominated Paul Givan as First Minister and Sinn Féin re-nominated Michelle O'Neill as deputy First Minister. On 4 February 2022, Givan resigned as First Minister, which led to O'Neill automatically ceasing to hold office as deputy First Minister.

Responsibilities 

The First Minister and deputy First Minister share equal responsibilities within government, and their decisions are made jointly. The First Minister is, though, the first to greet official visitors to Northern Ireland and shares the same title as their counterparts in Scotland and Wales. Specifically, they are tasked with co-chairing meetings of the Northern Ireland Executive, "dealing with and co-ordinating" the work of the Executive, and the response of the administration to external relationships.

The First Minister and deputy First Minister agree the agenda of Executive meetings and can jointly determine "significant or controversial matters" to be considered by the Executive.

The ministers' policy responsibilities include:
 economic policy
 equality before the law
 European Union issues
 human rights
 the machinery of government (including the Ministerial Code)
 public appointments policy
 standards in public life

Two junior ministers assist the First Minister and deputy First Minister in carrying out the work of Executive Office. They are jointly accountable to the First Minister and deputy First Minister. The incumbent junior ministers are Gary Middleton (Democratic Unionist Party) and Declan Kearney (Sinn Féin).

Election 

As originally established under the Northern Ireland Act 1998, the First Minister was elected by the Assembly on a joint ticket with the deputy First Minister through a cross-community vote. It was created to enable the leaders of the main unionist and nationalist parties to work together, with guaranteed joint representation of both main communities. For the purposes of a cross-community vote, MLAs were designated as unionist, nationalist, or other.

The nominees for First Minister and deputy First Minister required the support of:
 a majority of the MLAs voting in the election overall;
 a majority of the designated unionist MLAs voting; and
 a majority of the designated nationalist MLAs voting.

This procedure was used on 2 December 1999 to elect David Trimble (Ulster Unionist Party, UUP) and Seamus Mallon (Social Democratic and Labour Party, SDLP). Following several suspensions of the Northern Ireland Executive, Trimble was not re-elected on 2 November 2001 due to opposition from other unionist parties. He was subsequently re-elected alongside Mark Durkan (SDLP) on 6 November 2001; on that occasion, three Alliance Party of Northern Ireland MLAs redesignated from 'other' to 'unionist' to support Trimble's nomination.

Following the St Andrews Agreement in October 2006, the appointment procedure was changed to allow for:
 a First Minister nominated by the largest party of the largest designation;
 a deputy First Minister nominated by the largest party of the second largest designation.

This procedure, which removed the need for a joint ticket between the unionist Democratic Unionist Party and the nationalist Sinn Féin party, was used to appoint Ian Paisley and Martin McGuinness on 8 May 2007. It was again used to appoint Peter Robinson (DUP) alongside McGuinness on 5 June 2008 and again on 12 May 2011, and to appoint Arlene Foster (DUP) alongside McGuinness on 11 January 2016, also to appoint Foster alongside Michelle O'Neill on 11 January 2020, as well as to appoint Paul Givan alongside O'Neill on 17 June 2021.

The new rules from 2006 also state that, if the largest party of the largest designation happens not to also be the largest party in the assembly overall, then the appointment procedure would be as follows:
 a First Minister nominated by the largest party overall;
 a deputy First Minister nominated by the largest party of the largest designation.
As of 2020, this latter method has never yet been used.

The Minister of Justice is now the only Northern Ireland Executive minister elected by cross-community vote. All other ministers are party appointees, with parties taking turns using the D'Hondt method.

Vacancy 

The First Minister or deputy First Minister may also appoint another Northern Ireland Executive Minister to exercise the functions of the office during a vacancy; currently for a continuous period up to six weeks.

Vacancies have occurred on four occasions to date:
 First Minister
 Reg Empey for David Trimble (1 July 2001 – 6 November 2001)
 Arlene Foster for Peter Robinson (11 January 2010 – 3 February 2010)
 Arlene Foster for Peter Robinson (10 September 2015 – 20 October 2015)

 Deputy First Minister
 John O'Dowd for Martin McGuinness (20 September 2011 – 31 October 2011)

Terminology

Titles in Irish and Ulster Scots
In the Irish language, the literal translation of these positions is "Céad-Aire agus an leas Chéad-Aire". The titles appear in both English and Irish in published literature by the North-South Ministerial Council, one of the "mutually inter-dependent" institutions laid out in the Good Friday Agreement, along with the Northern Ireland Assembly.

Capitalisation of "deputy"
The second position has been written as "Deputy" or "deputy" First Minister, due to differing preferences by civil servants (and potentially ministers), although the capitalisation of the title has no constitutional consequences in practice.

The first two holders of the office, Seamus Mallon and Mark Durkan, were both referred to during their periods of office as "Deputy First Minister", with a capital 'D'. In the Good Friday Agreement, also known as the Belfast Agreement, which established the executive in Northern Ireland, the two positions are spelt "First Minister and Deputy First Minister" (with a capital 'D'). This was also adopted in 1999 for the logo of the OFMDFM. Several weeks after Martin McGuinness took up office as Deputy First Minister in 2007, civil servants in his department began asking the Assembly's Hansard team to replace the capital 'D' with a lower-case 'd', pointing out that the title was spelled this way in the Northern Ireland Act 1998, the legislation which established the office. Some believe that the case was changed to highlight the fact that the position holds the same power as the position of First Minister, but a spokesman for McGuinness said that neither McGuinness nor his advisers had asked for the change. Speaker William Hay ordered the change and the capital 'D' was no longer used in Hansard references.

Officials edited the department's archive of press releases to make that change (despite its use by Mallon and Durkan when in office) but the capital 'D' still appears in some places, and a spokesman confirmed on 20 March 2008 that the office had "no plans" to change the OFMDFM logo. However, the Assembly committee that scrutinises their work is now listed as the "Committee for the Office of the First Minister and deputy First Minister". Ultimately it was decided that McGuinness should be the deputy First Minister, unless all the other letters in the title are in capitals. Confusion isn't completely resolved however; if McGuinness wrote to the Assembly committee that scrutinised his work, his note would have a letterhead that comes from the Office of the First Minister and Deputy First Minister, but he would get a reply back from the Committee for the Office of the First Minister and deputy First Minister.

In official language, the positions are sometimes abbreviated to FM/dFM.

Alternative titles for the deputy First Minister
Sinn Féin started using the phrases "Joint First Minister" and "Co-First Minister" in 2009 to describe the deputy First Minister to highlight the fact that the First Minister and deputy First Minister operated in tandem. Martin McGuinness used the term Joint First Minister himself when he arrived for a meeting of the North/South Ministerial Council in February 2009; the DUP denounced the term as "republican speak" and it is not used in legislation. Jim Allister, the leader of the Traditional Unionist Voice, long called Robinson and McGuinness "the joint first ministers", to highlight the joint nature of the office and to demonstrate his opposition to the power-sharing arrangements.

With the restoration of power-sharing in 2020, Sinn Féin started describing the position as "joint head of government".

History 

Following a referendum on the Belfast Agreement on 23 May 1998 and subsequent the Northern Ireland Act 1998, the Northern Ireland Assembly was established in 1998 with a view to assuming devolved powers from the Westminster Parliament. On 1 July 1998, David Trimble (UUP) and Seamus Mallon (SDLP) were nominated and elected First Minister and Deputy First Minister designates respectively. Eventually, on 2 December 1999, power was devolved and Trimble and Mallon formally took office as joint heads of the Northern Ireland Executive.

On 6 November 2001, Mark Durkan (SDLP) became Deputy First Minister after Seamus Mallon's retirement. The Executive and the two positions were suspended between 15 October 2002 and 8 May 2007 following a breakdown in trust between the parties.

On 8 May 2007, Ian Paisley (DUP) and Martin McGuinness (Sinn Féin) were appointed First Minister and Deputy First Minister respectively in line with the agreement between their two parties on 26 March 2007.

Paisley stated his intention to resign on 4 March 2008. His deputy as DUP leader, Peter Robinson was ratified as Democratic Unionist Party leader designate on 17 April 2008 and became First Minister on 5 June 2008. Arlene Foster succeeded Peter Robinson as DUP leader on 18 December 2015, and as First Minister on 11 January 2016.

After more than 20 DUP MLAs and four DUP MPs signed a letter "... voicing no confidence in her leadership", Foster resigned as party leader on 28 May 2021, and as First Minister in June 2021. Her successor as the leader of the Democratic Unionist Party, Edwin Poots, said he would not become the First Minister. Instead, DUP MLA Paul Givan was nominated for First Minister by Poots. Despite concerns by Sinn Féin that an Irish Language Act would not pass, following talks with the British government they agreed to renominate Michelle O'Neill for deputy First Minister. However, 24 of the DUP's 28 MLAs voted against Givan, leading to Poots' resignation as party leader.

Separately, between 12 February 2000 and 30 May 2000, and 15 October 2002 and 8 May 2007, however, devolution was suspended, and along with it the offices of First Minister and deputy First Minister. The Office of the First Minister and deputy First Minister became the responsibility of the Secretary of State for Northern Ireland. There were also two 24-hour periods of suspension on 11 August 2001 and 22 September 2001. to allow timetables for negotiation to restart. Devolution was suspended from 10 January 2017 to 10 January 2020.

First Ministers and deputy First Ministers 
 Parties

Direct Rule First Ministers
During the periods of suspension, the Secretaries of State for Northern Ireland assumed the responsibilities of the First Minister and deputy First Minister.

Timeline

See also 
 Executive Office
 Junior Minister (Northern Ireland)
 List of current heads of government in the United Kingdom and dependencies
 List of government ministers in Northern Ireland
 Northern Ireland Executive

References

External links 
 Executive Office

 

Northern Ireland Executive
1998 establishments in the United Kingdom